Persoonia longifolia, commonly known as snottygobble, is a species of flowering plant in the family Proteaceae and is endemic to the southwest of Western Australia. It is a shrub or small tree characterised by its weeping foliage, yellow flowers and distinctive flaky bark.

Description
It has flaky-papery bark, brown or greyish on the surface and reddish purple below. Young branchlets are covered with brown to rust-coloured hairs.

Taxonomy and naming
Persoonia longifolia was first collected described in 1810 by Robert Brown Transactions of the Linnean Society of London. The species name derives from the Latin terms longus "long", and folium "leaf". Within the genus Persoonia, it is classified in the Lanceolata group, a group of 54 closely related species with similar flowers but very different foliage. These species will often interbreed with each other where two members of the group occur.

Distribution and habitat
Snottygobble is found in the southwest of Western Australia within  of the coast between Albany and the southeastern edges of Perth. It occurs in the jarrah, karri, marri and tingle forest.

Ecology
Persoonia longifolia resprouts from both epicormic buds and from the lignotuber after a fire, often several months later.

A study of the phenology of this species has concluded that it grows, flowers and sets fruit in summer. Young branches are often damaged by larvae of the tip-boring Ptyssoptera moth and by birds including the red-tailed black cockatoo (Calyptorhynchus banksii) and Australian ringneck parrot (Barnardius zonarius). Flowering commences in October and is completed by January, with peak flowering in November and December. The only pollinators observed during the study were native bees and the introduced honey-bee (Apis mellifera).

Mature fruit falls from late July to September and are often eaten by wallabies, kangaroos and the bobtail skink (Tiliqua rugosa). If left untouched by animals, the fleshy part of the fruit either rots or shrivels and dries. Germination occurs in late winter to early spring from fruits produced in the previous season but microclimate appears to be an important factor in germination rate. Even when germination occurs, few survive with most seedlings succumbing to desiccation or grazing.

Conservation status
This persoonia is classified as "not threatened" by the Western Australian Government Department of Parks and Wildlife.

Uses
In addition to being used for minesite restoration, P. longifolia is used in the cut-flower trade, being valued for its weeping appearance and durability. It also has potential in the nursery trade for its symmetrical habit, weeping foliage and textured, flaky bark, but studies have suggested that at least eighteen months of soil burial is required for seed germination.

References

External links
Discovering The Hills Forest. Part of an Environmental Education Program on the Western Australian Jarrah Forest for Year 6 and 7 students. Department of Conservation and Land Management (CALM). p 44.

longifolia
Eudicots of Western Australia
Plants described in 1810
Taxa named by Robert Brown (botanist, born 1773)
Endemic flora of Southwest Australia